WLID (1370 AM) is a radio station licensed to Patchogue, New York.  Established in 1952 as WALK, the station broadcasts a Spanish language Christian radio format.
 
WLID broadcasts at 500 watts by day. Because radio waves travel farther at night, the station reduces power to 102 watts at sunset to protect other stations on 1370 AM. WLID's transmitter is located at the former WALK studios on Colonial Drive in East Patchogue, New York.

History
The station, initially owned by the Suffolk Broadcasting Corporation, went on the air April 20, 1952 as WALK from studios on Colonial Drive in East Patchogue, New York. The station's studios would remain there for more than 62 years.

In its early years, WALK played nothing but classical, big-band, and jazz. It was purchased in 1963 by the Island Broadcasting System along with its sister stations, WALK-FM Patchogue, New York and WRIV Riverhead, New York. Island Broadcasting was owned in part by NBC News anchorman Chet Huntley. WALK was one of the first stations on Long Island to run a full schedule of Christmas music during the holiday season. The holiday format began in 1995. In later years, it was run on both WALK and WALK-FM.

On May 15, 2014, Qantum Communications announced that it would acquire WALK and WALK-FM from the Aloha Station Trust in exchange for transferring its existing 29 stations to the WALK stations' former owner, Clear Channel Communications. Qantum then immediately resold the WALK stations to Connoisseur Media. On September 12, 2014, WALK flipped to a simulcast of WHLI's adult standards format.

On October 30, 2019, it was announced that Connoisseur Media would be donating WALK's license to Cantico Nuevo Ministry, the owner of WNYG Patchogue, New York, and WLIM Medford, New York. As part of the deal, Iglesias de Evangelizacion Misionera Jovenus Cristianos de EU Inc. purchased WALK's transmitter site and former studios for $500,000. The deal was consummated on December 31, 2019. As Connoisseur retained the rights to the "WALK" call sign for WALK-FM, 1370's call letters were changed to WLID.

References

External links

 
 

Mass media in Suffolk County, New York
Radio stations established in 1952
1952 establishments in New York (state)
LID
Patchogue, New York